Flam is a surname. Notable people with the surname (or its variant Flahm) include:

Faye Flam, American science writer
Harry Flam (born 1948), Swedish economics professor at Stockholm University
Helena Flam (born 1951), Polish-born sociology professor at the University of Leipzig
Herbert Flam (1928–1980), Jewish-American tennis player
Leopold Flam (1912–1995), Belgian philosopher
Shlomo Flam (died 1813), Volhynian rabbi

See also
Flam (disambiguation)